Marko Tomaš (born 19 December 1978) is a Bosnian poet, essayist  and journalist.

Biography 
He attended primary school in Mostar, Bosnia and Herzegovina, and Kljajićevo in Vojvodina, Serbia. He then finished high school in Sombor. Returning to Mostar, he enrolled in full-time law studies and study of Bosnian language and literature. After two years, he interrupted his studies and, together with his friends, founded the Alternative Institute, an association for multimedia art projects, and started the magazine for literature Kolaps and the publishing house Kolaps book production, where he was the editor. He ran the cult Split bookstore UTOPIA. From 2001 to 2003, he stayed in Sarajevo on a temporary basis. He often changed his place of residence, so he also lived in Sarajevo, Zagreb, Belgrade, Split and many other cities throughout the former Yugoslavia. He currently lives in Mostar, where he is the spokesman and leader of the OKC Abrašević club.

Literary work 
He is one of the founding editors of the magazine and publishing house Kolaps. He published poetry and prose in Bosnian and Herzegovinian, Croatian and Serbian periodicals, and newspaper articles and essays in Dani, Glas Istre and Feral Tribune. He publishes diary entries, essays, political and sports comments on the online portals Žurnal.ba and Lupiga.com, and in the magazine Urban Magazin from Sarajevo. He won the Super Cyber Story Award for storytelling, and Farah Tahirbegović Award for his engagement in the culture of Bosnia and Herzegovina.

Motifs and his writing style is described in words of his publisher: "What distinguishes his work, regardless of the form and genre, is honesty. Constant life reconsideration, unpretentiousness, strong emotions, various faces of love, melancholy, war, but also the colors of everyday life - these are the characteristics of his poetry and prose. With his poetry, Marko lives a life outside the prescribed rules".

Compared to early Leonard Cohen, he is described as a "poet of a rare sensuality and emotional refinement with a rarefied bohemian touch".

He is one of the most successful and most popular contemporary poets from the Balkans. His poems have been translated into Italian, French, Polish, German, Slovenian, English and Albanian.

His poem is included in one of the more recent theater production of Dušan Kovačević play Balkanski špijun, performed at the Raša Plaović the stage of the National Theater in Belgrade.

One of his most famous works is the poem Pismo Venjički, inspired by the poem Moskva Petushki by the Russian writer Venedikt Yerofeyev.

Bibliography 
Some of Tomaš works include:

 "L'amore al primo binocolo" (sa M. Begićem, N. Ćišićem i V. Gatalom), 2000.
 "Tri puta trideset i tri jednako" (s M. Begićem i N. Ćišićem) Mostar, 2001.
 "S rukama pod glavom" Zagreb, 2002.
 "Mama, ja sam uspješan" Zagreb, 2004.
 "Život je šala" Zagreb, 2005.
 "Marko Tomaš i druge pjesme" Zagreb-Sarajevo, 2007.
 "Zbogom, fašisti" Sarajevo, 2009.
 "Bulevar narodne revolucije" Zagreb, 2013.
 "Varanje smrti - izabrane pesme" Beograd, 2014.
 "Ivica Osim - utakmice života" Zenica-Beograd, 2014.
 "Kolodvor i paranoja" Beograd, 2015.
 "Odrastanje melankolije" Beograd, 2015.
 "Crni molitvenik" Zagreb-Beograd, 2015.
 "Regata papirnih brodova" Beograd, 2017.
 "Trideset deveti maj" Beograd, 2018. Zagreb, 2019.
 "Pisma s juga" (a book of essays and columns) Beograd, 2019.
 "Pjesme sa granice" (trilogy composed of the last three collections of poems) Sarajevo, 2019.
 "Želim postati terorist" (knjiga izabranih pesama) LJubljana, 2019.
 "Nemoj me buditi" (prvi roman) Beograd, 2019.

References 
 

Bosnia and Herzegovina journalists
Bosnia and Herzegovina poets
People from Ljubljana
1978 births
Bosnia and Herzegovina essayists
Living people